Ernesto Alfredo Castro Aldana (born 26 May 1971) is a Salvadoran politician who is the incumbent president of the Legislative Assembly of El Salvador.

Political career 

From 2012 to 2015, Castro was the secretary and private advisor to the municipal mayor of Nuevo Cuscatlán, who was then Nayib Bukele. From 2015 to 2018, he served as Bukele's Secretary and Private Advisor when he was serving as Mayor of San Salvador. Castro became the private secretary to President Bukele on 1 June 2019.

In the 2021 Salvadoran legislative election, Castro was elected as a deputy to the Legislative Assembly of El Salvador from the department of San Salvador. On 1 May 2021, he was voted in as the President of the Legislative Assembly with 64 votes in favor of him and 20 abstentions.

Personal life 

Castro is married to Michelle Sol, the Minister of Housing of El Salvador.

Notes

References 

1971 births
Living people
Presidents of the Legislative Assembly of El Salvador
21st-century Salvadoran politicians
Members of the Legislative Assembly of El Salvador
Nuevas Ideas politicians